Charles William Foster Jr. (April 12, 1828January 9, 1904) was a U.S. Republican politician from Ohio. Foster was the 35th governor of Ohio, and later went on to serve as Secretary of the Treasury under Benjamin Harrison.

Biography

Foster was born outside of Tiffin, Ohio, and grew up in the western Seneca County boomtown of Rome.  This town would merge in 1854 with the nearby town of Risdon to form one city, named Fostoria in honor of Charles W. Foster Sr., his father. He was elected to the United States House of Representatives in 1870, serving from 1871 to 1879. He was defeated for re-election in 1878, but was elected to the governorship a year later, serving two two-year terms between 1880 and 1884. Foster was unsuccessful in a bid to return to the House in 1890, but was appointed by Benjamin Harrison a year later to become Secretary of the Treasury upon the death of William Windom. Foster served out the remainder of Harrison's term before retiring. From 1891 to 1893, future Postmaster General Robert Wynne served as his personal secretary.

During the transition, after Grover Cleveland won the presidential election, Harrison dismissed to the United States Congress signs that there was a pending economic crisis. He also ignored the urging of individuals such as J.P. Morgan to take steps to reassure investors. One of the first clear signs of financial crisis came on February 20, 1893, twelve days prior to Cleveland's inauguration, when receivers were appointed for the Philadelphia and Reading Railroad, which had greatly overextended itself. Harrison and Foster did not take action, instead leaving the financial crisis at Cleveland's feet. Instead of addressing the economic crisis, Foster spent his final days as secretary posing for his official portrait. Republicans would ultimately go on to subsequently blame Cleveland for causing the economic downturn that he had, in actuality, inherited from the Republican Harrison.

Charles Foster was married November 7, 1853 to Ann M. Olmstead of Fremont, Ohio. They had two daughters, Jessie and Anna.

Death
In January 1904, Foster planned to attend the inauguration of Governor Myron T. Herrick. He stopped overnight at the home of his old friend, General J. Warren Keifer, in Springfield, Ohio. He died at Keifer's home the next day, January 9, 1904.

Notes

References

External links

Charles Foster entry at the National Governors Association
Charles Foster entry at The Political Graveyard

1828 births
1904 deaths
19th-century American politicians
Republican Party governors of Ohio
United States Secretaries of the Treasury
Mayors of places in Ohio
People from Fostoria, Ohio
People from Tiffin, Ohio
Benjamin Harrison administration cabinet members
Burials in Ohio
Republican Party members of the United States House of Representatives from Ohio